Camp Kiwanee is a summer camp and function facility at 1 Camp Kiwanee Road in Hanson, Massachusetts.  The core of the property is a summer estate called "The Needles" which was built by industrialist Albert Cameron Burrage between 1899 and 1905.  This property was purchased by the Boston chapter of the Camp Fire Girls, and adapted for use as a girls' summer camp.  From the 1930s to the 1950s a series of recreational facilities was constructed, and the camp was enlarged by the purchase of adjacent properties.  The Town of Hanson purchased the camp from the Camp Fire Girls in 1979, and continues to operate it as a campground and function facility.

The camp was listed on the National Register of Historic Places in 2005.

See also
National Register of Historic Places listings in Plymouth County, Massachusetts

References

External links
Camp Kiwanee website

Historic districts in Plymouth County, Massachusetts
Shingle Style architecture in Massachusetts
Hanson, Massachusetts
National Register of Historic Places in Plymouth County, Massachusetts
Campgrounds in Massachusetts
Historic districts on the National Register of Historic Places in Massachusetts
Camp Fire (organization)